Antonina Maria Izabela Wiłucka-Kowalska was a Polish religious leader, who served as the first archpriestess of the Catholic Mariavite Church. 
Wiłucka-Kowalska was the first woman to receive the sacrament of holy orders in Poland and consecration as a bishop.

Positions held

Early life

Wiłucka was a member of the Polish landed gentry. She was the daughter of Adam Wiłucki and Maria Antonina .
She attended the Russian gymnasium in Warsaw for several years, and then enrolled in Marta Łojkówna's pedagogical institute for women in Warsaw.
She graduated in 1909.

One of the Orda proposed marriage.
She became familiar with the English, French, German, and Russian languages, and she was musically talented.

Appointment 

After the outbreak of the World War I and the death of the estate owner, with his family Ordów, she was deported to Crimea, where, after three years, in 1918, she returned to the Second Polish Republic, to his family in Warsaw.

In the same year, while she was with a family in Płock, she encountered Mariavitism and Feliksa Kozłowska, its founder. Soon afterward, despite her family's objections, she joined the Mariavite Sisters.

In 1920, she took the religious name of Maria Izabela. Wiłucka was Kozłowska's suggested successor as Superior General of the Mariavite Sisters, which Wiłucka became after she professed perpetual vows on 8 September 1922.

In the same year, after the introduction of clerical marriage into the Old Catholic Mariavite Church, she married the charismatic leader of the church, Archbishop Jan Maria Michał Kowalski on 3 October 1922, in one of the first secret mystical marriages – between a priest and a nun.

Bishop of the Old Catholic Mariavite Church 

In 1929, after the introduction of the ordination of women in the Old Catholic Mariavite Church, Wiłucka-Kowalska and 11 other nuns were ordained in Płock on 28 March 1929. in Plock, and Wiłucka-Kowalska was then consecrated as a bishop.
Her responsibilities included care of the priesthood of sisters.

In 1926, Wiłucka-Kowalska participated in an unsuccessful Old Catholic Mariavite Church bishops delegation to the Balkans and Middle East, where she presented the mission and activities of the Old Catholic Mariavite Church to Eastern Christian Churches.

Bishop of the Catholic Mariavite Church 

The schism of the Catholic Mariavite Church from the Old Catholic Mariavite Church, in 1935, forced Wiłucka-Kowalska and her husband, Kowalski, and their followers to move to Felicjanów.

She remained the Superior General of the Congregation of the Mariavite Sisters and participated in the management of the Catholic Mariavite Church, which separated from the main Mariavite denomination.

While her husband, Kowalski, served 18 months of a prison sentence beginning in July 1936 for his 1928 and 1929 convictions, Wiłucka-Kowalska exercised authority over the church.
From 1936 to 1939, she resumed publication of a fortnightly periodical, in Felicjanów.

Following the arrest by the Gestapo of Kowalski in January 1940 and his deportation to the Priest Barracks of Dachau Concentration Camp, Wiłucka-Kowalska took over the management of the Catholic Mariavite Church until her death in 1946.

In March 1941, all the inhabitants of the church commune in Felicjanów were deported to Soldau concentration camp, then to a camp in the Modlin Fortress and then to Pomiechówek. After her release, Wiłucka-Kowalska lived in Plonsk, where some sisters were employed at a hospital. As far as possible, she led the Catholic Mariavite Church and maintained correspondence with her husband, who was imprisoned in Dachau concentration camp.

After the front passed through, in the spring of 1945 she returned to the destroyed Felicjanów. She died on 28 November 1946. She was buried in the park in front of the manor house in Felicjanów. After her death, she was regarded by Catholic Mariavite Church adherents as a saint.

Notes

Citations

References

External links

1890 births
1946 deaths
Mariavite Church
20th-century bishops
Polish Old Catholic bishops
Women bishops